Guo may refer to:

People 
 Guo (郭), a Chinese surname
 Consort Guo (disambiguation)
 Empress Guo (disambiguation)
 Prince Guo

Places 
 Guo Prefecture (disambiguation)
 Eastern Guo, an ancient Chinese state
 Western Guo, an ancient Chinese state, divided into Northern Guo and Southern Guo

Other uses 
 Guayabero language
 Gualaco Airport, in Honduras
 Main Guard Directorate, a branch of the Soviet Union's KGB